Marcel Moget (born 23 April 1931) is a Swiss basketball player. He competed in the men's tournament at the 1952 Summer Olympics.

References

1931 births
Living people
Swiss men's basketball players
Olympic basketball players of Switzerland
Basketball players at the 1952 Summer Olympics
Place of birth missing (living people)